House of Miracles may refer to:
 House of Miracles (communal house), a series of Christian communal houses
 House of Miracles (The Vels album), 1986
 House of Miracles (Brandon Lake album), 2020